William Livingstone may refer to:

William Livingstone House, located in the Brush Park district of Detroit, Michigan, United States
William Livingstone, 6th Lord Livingston (died 1592), Scottish lord of Parliament
William Jervis Livingstone (1865–1915), Scottish planter in Africa
William Livingstone (minister), 17th-century minister and writer in Lanark, Scotland

See also
William Livingston (disambiguation)